Burrator is a grouped parish council in the English county of Devon. It is entirely within the boundaries of the Dartmoor National Park and was formed in 1973 as a result of the Local Government Act 1972 from the older councils of Meavy, Sheepstor and Walkhampton.

The parish has an area of 59.45 km2 (23 sq miles), and is one of the most sparsely populated. The population count in 2001 found that 1,540 people lived in the parish. The parish coincides with the similarly named electoral ward, and at the 2011 census the population had decreased to 1,445. The ward contains the villages of Dousland, Meavy, Sheepstor and Walkhampton, and also Burrator Reservoir which is the main water supply for Plymouth. The parish is twinned with the municipality of Mathieu, in Normandy, France.

Burrator Parish Council holds the ownership of the Royal Oak Inn at Meavy, which dates back to the 16th Century. The Inn is leased to a tenant publican and the council's ownership and administration of the Inn is managed by its Royal Oak Inn committee, composed of Meavy parish councillors.

The parish of Burrator is named after Burra Tor, a large granite tor that is exposed from the field to the woodland by the dam; located at Grid Reference 553679 at the southern end of the reservoir and about halfway between its two dams blocking the outlets to the River Meavy and the Sheepstor Brook.

James Brooke, the first white Rajah of Sarawak, died in Burrator.

References

Further reading
Barley, Nigel. White Rajah. London: Time Warner, 2002. .

External links
Burrator Parish Council

Dartmoor
Local government in Devon
Tors of Dartmoor